Philippe-Sirice Bridel (also Philippe Cyriaque), known as le Doyen Bridel (born 20 November 1757 in Begnins, Bernese Vogtei of Nyon, died 20 May 1845 in Montreux, canton of Vaud, Swiss Confederation) was a man of letters, advocate of Swiss folklore, active during the development of Swiss national identity.

Biography
Bridel served as a pastor at Basle, Château-d'Oex and Montreux. He began writing poetry in 1782 and is considered the earliest Vaudois poets by virtue of his Poèsies helvtiennes (1782). He is known for his work on Swiss history and linguistics, specifically for his glossary of the patois of French-speaking Switzerland, published posthumously in 1866. However he is better known as the painter of the scenery and people among whom he worked as pastor. 

Bridel's Course de Bâle à Bienne par les vallées du Jura appeared in 1802, while descriptions of his travels, as well as of the manners of the natives, local history, and in short everything that could stimulate national sentiment, were issued in a series of periodicals from 1783 to 1831 under the successive titles of Etrennes helvétiennes and of Conservateur suisse. His patriotic aim met with great success, while his impressions of his mountain wanderings are fresh and unspoilt by any straining after effect. 

Bridel was the first writer of the Suisse Romande to undertake such wanderings, so that, with obvious differences, he may be regarded not merely as the forerunner, but as the inspirer and model of later Vaudois travellers and climbers in the Alps, such as Rodolphe Töpffer, of Eugène Rambert, and Rambert's pupil, Émile Javelle (1844–1883), whose articles were collected in 1886 by his friends under the title of Souvenirs d'un alpiniste.

Bibliography
1789, Course de Bale a Bienne
1791, Mélanges Hélvétiques Des Années 1787–1790
1866, Glossaire du patois de la Suisse romande (ed. Louis Favrat)

References

External links
 Pictures and texts of Voyage pittoresque de Basle à Bienne par les vallons de Mottiers-Grandval, Recueil de paysages suisses dessinés d'après nature, dans une course par la vallée d'Ober-hasly et les cantons de Schweitz et d'Oury and Course de Bâle à Bienne par les vallées du Jura by Philippe-Sirice Bridel can be found in the database VIATIMAGES.

Swiss folklorists
19th-century Swiss poets
Swiss male poets
1757 births
1845 deaths
19th-century male writers